Applied Physics A: Materials Science and Processing is a peer-reviewed scientific journal that is published monthly by Springer Science+Business Media. The editor-in-chief is Thomas Lippert (Paul Scherrer Institute). This publication is complemented by Applied Physics B (Lasers & Optics).

History
The journal Applied Physics was originally conceived and founded in 1972 by Helmut K.V. Lotsch at Springer-Verlag Berlin Heidelberg New York. Lotsch edited the journal up to volume 25 and split it thereafter into the two part A26(Solids and Surfaces) and B26(Photophysics and Laser Chemistry). He continued his editorship up to the volumes A61 and B61. Starting in 1995 the two journal were was continued under separate editorships.

Aims and scope
Applied Physics A journal covers theoretical and experimental research in applied physics, including surfaces, thin films, the condensed phase of materials, nanostructured materials, application of nanotechnology, and techniques pertaining to advanced processing and characterization. Coverage also includes characterizing materials, evaluating materials, optical & electronic materials, production engineering, process engineering, interfaces (surfaces & thin films), corrosion, and finally coatings.

Publishing formats include articles pertaining to original research, reviews, and rapid communications. Invited papers are also included on a regular basis and collected in special issues.

Abstracting and indexing
This journal is abstracted and indexed in: 

According to the Journal Citation Reports, the journal has a 2020 impact factor of 2.584.

References

External links 
 

Materials science journals
Physics journals
Springer Science+Business Media academic journals
English-language journals
Publications established in 1973
Journals published between 13 and 25 times per year